{{Infobox university
|name           = KSKV Kachchh University
|image          = Krantiguru Shyamji Krishna Verma Kachchh University Main Gate.jpg
|caption = Main gate
| logo = Kachchh University Logo.jpg
|motto          = तेजस्वि नावधीतमस्तु 
|established    = 2003
|chancellor     = Acharya Devvrat
|vice_chancellor=  Jayrajsinh Dilavarsinji Jadeja
|city           = Bhuj, Gujarat
|country        = India
|students       = 15,000+ 
|type           = Public
|campus         = Rural
|affiliations   = UGC
|website        = Official Website
}}Krantiguru Shyamji Krishna Verma Kachchh University' is a state university in Gujarat, India that promotes higher education in regional and rural areas of the country. It is named after Shyamji Krishna Varma of Kachchh, Gujarat.

History

Colleges in the Kutch district were regulated under the Gujarat University till 2003. However, following the development drive post 2001 Gujarat earthquake, the government of Gujarat decided to provide a separate university for the region of Kachchh. The Krantiguru Shyamji Krishna Verma Kachchh University Act was published in the government Gazette'' in March 2003.

The foundation stone for the building was laid on 24 September 2004. The construction work for the administrative blocks, four faculty blocks, library, computer building, guest house, hostels was estimated at 35 crores (funded by Gujarat State). The Kachchh University started its administrative and academic activity at the new developing campus in 2007.

The university started with 10 colleges in 2004, having 44 colleges with more than 20,000 students and nearly 250 teachers working in the faculties of Arts, Commerce, Science, Education, Law, Technology including Engineering and Pharmacy.

Departments

 Department of Chemistry
 Department of Earth & Environment Science
 Department of Computer Science
 Department of Archeology
 Department of English
 Department of Education
 Department of Gujarati
 Department of Sanskrit
 Department of Commerce & Management
 Department of Economics
 Department of Social Work
 Department of Public Administration

Affiliated colleges and institutes
 HJD Science College
 Sheth D. L. Law College
 Shri Ramji Ravji Lalan College
 Shri Ramji Ravjii Lalan College
 Sheth Shoorji Vallabhadas Arts and Commerce College
 Tolani College of Arts and Science
 MEWS College of Management & IT
 GMDC sponsored:  MV and MP Ramani Arts College and RK Khetani Commerce College
 Dada Dukhayal College of Education 
 Dr. H. R. Gajwani College of Education
 Tolani Institute of Commerce
 Shri J B Thacker Commerce College
 SRK Institute of Social Sciences
 SRK Institute of Management and Computer Education
 Smt. H B Palan College of Arts and Commerce
 Baba Naharsingh Indraprastha Maha Vidyalaya 
 Baba Naharsingh Indraprastha Maha Vidyalaya 
 SMT. V D Thakker College of Education
 M. D. College Of Education
 Shri Narayan Computer College
 S. D. Shethia College of Education
 Shri Z. N. Patel Che. Trust Sanchalit M.S.W. PG Centre
 Tolani Commerce College
 Sanskar Institute of Management & Information Technology 
 Seth R.D. Education Trust Sanchalit  Keniya and Ankarvala & Smt. C H Shah Arts & Commerce College, Mundra 
 Veerayatan Institute of Computer Application and Business Administration 
 University Study Center for External Studies
 Anchor Education Society Sanchalit College of PGDHRM
 D. N. V. International Education Academy
 B.M.C.B. College of Nursing
 Tolani Motwane Institute of Law
SGJ institute of counterproductivity

References

External links
Official website
Department of Computer Science
Department of Chemistry

Universities in Gujarat
Education in Kutch district
Bhuj
2003 establishments in Gujarat
Educational institutions established in 2003